Gerald Roscoe "Jerry" Wilson (December 9, 1936 – March 5, 2015) was a professional American football defensive end with the Philadelphia Eagles (1959–1960) and the San Francisco 49ers (1960) of the National Football League. He also played for the Toronto Argonauts (1962–1964). Wilson played college football at Auburn University, helping them win an NCAA national championship. He graduated from Phillips High in Birmingham, Alabama.

NFL career
Wilson was drafted by the Chicago Cardinals in 1959. Before entering a regular season game, he was traded to the Philadelphia Eagles on September 4, 1959, for Jerry Norton. Included in the deal to the Eagles was Bob Konovsky. Midway through the 1960 season, Wilson was traded to the San Francisco 49ers.

Post-NFL
In 1961, Wilson was called to active duty for overseas duty in the Air National Guard. He returned in 1962 to play two years with the Toronto Argonauts of the Canadian Football League.

References

External links
 Just Sports Stats
 Obituary

1936 births
2015 deaths
American football defensive ends
Canadian football defensive linemen
Players of Canadian football from Birmingham, Alabama
Players of American football from Birmingham, Alabama
Auburn Tigers football players
Philadelphia Eagles players
San Francisco 49ers players
Toronto Argonauts players
Alabama National Guard personnel